All Jokes Aside was a comedy club in south-side Chicago which catered almost exclusively to the African-American sector. It opened in 1992 with 275 seats, and ran for "less than a decade". The club's success led to a Comedy Central series as well as a second location in Detroit. In 1994 the company had a turnover of $470,000.

Notable Performers
Bill Bellamy
Cedric the Entertainer
Earthquake
Mike Epps
Jamie Foxx
Adele Givens
Donald Glover
Godfrey
Eddie Griffin
Kevin Hart
Steve Harvey
D.L. Hughley
Martin Lawrence
Ali LeRoi
Luenell
Bernie Mac
Henry Spoon
Carlos Mencia
Mo'Nique
Charlie Murphy
Patrice O'Neal
Chris Rock
Craig Robinson
Sherri Shepherd
J. B. Smoove
Robert L. Hines
Sommore
Sheryl Underwood
Thea Vidale
Katt Williams

References
Magazines:

Books:

Defunct comedy clubs in the United States
Theatre in Chicago
African-American history in Chicago